The 1985 Italian Grand Prix was a Formula One motor race held at Monza on 8 September 1985. It was the twelfth round of the 1985 FIA Formula One World Championship. It was the 55th Italian Grand Prix and the 50th to be held at Monza. The race was held over 51 laps of the 5.8-kilometre circuit for a total race distance of 295.8 kilometres.

The race was won by Frenchman Alain Prost driving a McLaren MP4/2B. It was Prost's fifth and final victory of the 1985 season as he powered towards the first of his four Formula One world championships. Prost won by almost 52 seconds over the Brazilian duo Nelson Piquet (Brabham BT54) and Ayrton Senna (Lotus 97T).

It was the debut race for the American owned Haas Lola team with their new car, the Lola THL1 running the Hart 415T turbocharged engine, driven by Australia's  World Champion Alan Jones. Jones, who had retired following the  season, was making a full-time return to Formula One after two races, the US Grand Prix West, and the non championship Race of Champions with Arrows in early .

Missing from the grid was popular West German driver Stefan Bellof who was killed a week earlier in a World Sportscar Championship race at the Spa Circuit in Belgium. With his funeral set for the day after the Italian Grand Prix the Tyrrell team only ran the one car for Martin Brundle feeling it would be disrespectful to Bellof to bring a driver in to replace him for the race. Members of the Tyrrell team, including team boss Ken Tyrrell, attended Bellof's funeral the next day.

Senna's pole position is often cited as one of his greatest moments.

Classification

Qualifying
Pole position went to Ayrton Senna; his 5th pole of the year. His average speed was 152.487 mph (245.405 km/h).

Race

Championship standings after the race

Drivers' Championship standings

Constructors' Championship standings

Note: Only the top five positions are included for both sets of standings.

References

External links
 Grand Prix Archives Video

Italian Grand Prix
Grand Prix
Italian Grand Prix
Italian Grand Prix